Jurnee Diana Smollett (born October 1, 1986) is an American  actress. She began her career as a child actress appearing on television sitcoms, including On Our Own (1994–1995) and Full House (1992–1994). She gained greater recognition with her role in the critically acclaimed Kasi Lemmons directed film Eve's Bayou (1997), which earned her a Critics' Choice Movie Award. 

As an adult, Smollett has starred in the films The Great Debaters (2007), Temptation: Confessions of a Marriage Counselor (2013), and Birds of Prey (2020). Her television roles include the NBC sports drama Friday Night Lights (2009–2011), the WGN America period drama Underground (2016–2017), and the HBO fantasy horror dramas True Blood (2013–2014) and Lovecraft Country (2020), receiving a nomination for the Primetime Emmy Award for Outstanding Lead Actress in a Drama Series for the latter. In 2020, Smollett portrayed DC Comic superhero Dinah Lance / Black Canary in the DC Extended Universe (DCEU) feature film Birds of Prey.

Early life 
Jurnee Diana Smollett was born in New York City, to Janet Harris and Joel Smollett. Her father was Ashkenazi Jewish, with ancestors from Romania, Russia and Poland, while her mother is African American. She is the fourth of six siblings, all performers: one sister, Jazz Smollett, and four brothers, Jussie, JoJo, Jake, and Jocqui.

Career

Early works 
Smollett began her acting career appearing on Martin and Out All Night in 1992. She then had recurring roles as Denise Frazer on the ABC family sitcoms Full House and Hangin' with Mr. Cooper. From 1994 to 1995, she co-starred with her siblings in the short-lived ABC sitcom On Our Own. In 1996, she appeared in the Francis Ford Coppola film Jack, making her big-screen debut.

Smollett received critical acclaim for her performance as 10-year-old Eve in the 1997 film Eve's Bayou opposite Lynn Whitfield, Samuel L. Jackson and Debbi Morgan. In casting the role, writer-director Kasi Lemmons envisioned "a light-skinned black child who could convey the nuances of a Creole child in the 60s." She received the Critic's Choice Award and was nominated for a NAACP Image Award. The following year, she joined the cast of the CBS sitcom Cosby, for which she won two NAACP Image Awards. In 1999, Smollett starred in the ABC TV film Selma, Lord, Selma. In 2000, she co-starred with Sharon Stone and Billy Connolly in the film Beautiful Joe. In 2001, she played the daughter of Angela Bassett in the television film Ruby's Bucket of Blood. In 2005, she co-starred with Bow Wow and Brandon T. Jackson in the roller skating film Roll Bounce. In 2006, she appeared in the drama film Gridiron Gang.

2007–2012 
In 2007, Smollett portrayed Samantha Booke (loosely based on Henrietta Bell Wells), the sole female debater at Wiley College in the historical film The Great Debaters. The film was produced by Oprah Winfrey and Harvey Weinstein and starred Denzel Washington, who also directed the feature. For her performance, Smollett received NAACP Image Award for Outstanding Actress in a Motion Picture. The following year, she returned to television, appearing in two episodes of ABC medical drama Grey's Anatomy. From 2009 to 2011, she was a regular cast member in the DirecTV drama series Friday Night Lights playing Jess Merriweather. From 2010 to 2011, she also co-starred with Jim Belushi and Jerry O'Connell on the short-lived CBS legal drama The Defenders.

2013–present 

In 2013, Smollett played the leading role in the drama film Temptation: Confessions of a Marriage Counselor directed by Tyler Perry. The film received negative reviews from critics, but was a box-office hit, grossing $53,125,354. It is the highest-grossing Tyler Perry film which the writer-director did not star in, and the highest-grossing Tyler Perry drama. From 2013 to 2014, she was a regular on the HBO series True Blood. She later played Juanita Leonard, the wife of boxer Sugar Ray Leonard, in the 2016 biographical sport film Hands of Stone co-starring with Usher and Robert De Niro.

In 2015, Smollett was cast as lead character in the WGN America period drama series Underground. Smollett played Rosalee, a shy house slave working on a plantation in 1857. She portrayed Black Canary in the 2020 film Birds of Prey, and Letitia "Leti" Lewis in the 2020 HBO series Lovecraft Country. In August 2021, it was revealed that Smollett will star in a solo Black Canary Movie from Warner Bros. and DC Films at HBO Max. In November 2021, she joined Jamie Foxx and Tommy Lee Jones in Amazon Studios' courtroom drama project The Burial directed by Maggie Betts. In 2022, she executive produced and co-starred in the Netflix thriller film, Lou.

Personal life 
Smollett has been active in HIV/AIDS causes since she was 11. Her first encounter with the disease came at age seven when a crew member of On Our Own died of AIDS. She was inspired by the HIV/AIDS survivor Hydeia Broadbent, with whom she eventually worked for HIV/AIDS awareness, including for the Black AIDS Institute and Red Cross. She spoke at the Ryan White Youth Conference, and is on the Board of Directors of Artists for a New South Africa, an organization dedicated to HIV/AIDS in Africa. Smollett is also on the Board of Directors for the Children’s Defense Fund.

On October 24, 2010, Smollett married musician Josiah Bell. Their first child, a son named Hunter, was born on October 31, 2016. In March 2020, Smollett filed for divorce.

She has two siblings who are also actors: Jake Smollett and Jussie Smollett. Jussie was a star of television drama Empire and also convicted of a hate crime hoax in 2022.

Filmography

Film

Television

Awards and nominations

References

External links 
 

1986 births
20th-century American actresses
21st-century American actresses
Actresses from New York City
African-American activists
African-American actresses
African-American Jews
American child actresses
American film actresses
American people of Polish-Jewish descent
American people of Russian-Jewish descent
American people of Romanian-Jewish descent
American television actresses
HIV/AIDS activists
Jewish activists
Jewish American actresses
Living people
20th-century African-American women
20th-century African-American people
21st-century African-American women
21st-century American Jews